The Rizal Shrine, also known as the Museo ni José Rizal Fort Santiago is a museum dedicated to the lifework of José Rizal. It is located inside Fort Santiago in Intramuros, Manila, Philippines, beside the Plaza de Armas. Fort Santiago served as barracks for Spanish artillery soldiers during Spain's colonization of the islands. The museum is located in the building where Rizal spent his final night and hid his famous poem Mi último adiós (My Last Farewell) in an oil lamp later given to his sister, Trinidad. The shrine is home to various memorabilia such as the shells he collected in Dapitan, books, manuscripts and artwork.

In 2014, the National Historical Commission of the Philippines renovated the museum in order to attract younger audience.

See also
 National Historical Commission of the Philippines
 Rizal Park
 Rizal Shrine (Calamba)

References

External links

 

Shrine
Museums in Manila
National Shrines of the Philippines
Buildings and structures in Intramuros
Cultural Properties of the Philippines in Metro Manila
Landmarks in the Philippines
History museums in the Philippines
Biographical museums in the Philippines
1953 establishments in the Philippines